The 1989 Southwest Conference women's basketball tournament was held March 8–11, 1989, at Moody Coliseum in Dallas, Texas. 

Number 1 seed  defeated 2 seed  101-99 to win their 7th championship and receive the conference's automatic bid to the 1989 NCAA tournament.

Format and seeding 
The tournament consisted of a 6 team single-elimination tournament. The top two seeds had a bye to the Semifinals.

Tournament

References 

Southwest Conference women's Basketball Tournament
1989 in American women's basketball
1989 in sports in Texas
Basketball in Dallas